Stoyan Koprivlenski (born 21 June 1994) is a Bulgarian Muay Thai kickboxer, fighting out of Oostzaan, Netherlands and currently competing in the lightweight division of Glory. As of December 12, 2021, he is #1 in the official Glory lightweight rankings.

As of September 2022, Combat Press ranks him as the 10th best lightweight kickboxer in the world.

Kickboxing career
Koprivlenski was scheduled to make his Glory debut against Kevin Hessling at Glory 45: Amsterdam on September 30, 2017. He lost the fight by unanimous decision.

Koprivlenski participated in the Glory lightweight contender tournament, held at Glory 49: Rotterdam on December 9, 2017. He was scheduled to face Maykol Yurk in the tournament semifinals. Koprivlenski beat Yurk by a first-round knockout. Advancing to the tournament finals, Koprivlenski faced Tyjani Beztati. He won the fight by unanimous decision.

Koprivlenski was scheduled to face Josh Jauncey at Glory 52: Los Angeles on March 31, 2018. He lost the fight by split decision. The bout was later nominated as the 2018 "Fight of the Year".

Koprivlenski was scheduled to face Anil Cabri at Glory 59: Amsterdam on September 29, 2018. He won the fight by unanimous decision.

Koprivlenski was scheduled to fight a rematch with Tyjani Beztati at Glory 62: Rotterdam on December 8, 2018. He lost the fight by unanimous decision.

Koprivlenski was scheduled to face Mohammed Jaraya at Glory 66: Paris on June 22, 2019. He beat Jaraya by a third-round technical knockout.

Koprivlenski was scheduled to face Josh Jauncey for the second time in his career at Glory 73: Shenzhen on December 7, 2019. He lost the fight by split decision.

The COVID-19 pandemic forced Koprivlenski to seek fights outside of Glory, as the organization was unable to consistently hold events.. He was scheduled to face Cristian Milea at The Spirit of Bulgaria on October 3, 2020. He won the fight by unanimous decision.

Koprivlenski was scheduled to face Artur Zakirko at Max Fight 46 on August 2, 2021. He won the fight by unanimous decision.

Koprivlenski was scheduled to challenge Sorin Căliniuc for the Colosseum Tournament World Lightweight Championship at Colosseum Tournament 27 on September 20, 2021. He lost the closely contested fight by split decision.
 
Korpivlenski was scheduled to face Bruno Gazani at Glory: Collision 3 on October 23, 2021. He won the fight by unanimous decision, with all five judges awarding him a 30-27 scorecard.

Korpivlenski was expected to face the Fair Fight title holder Mamuka Usubyan, and then his replacement Amir Abdullahhad at Fair Fight XVI on February 12, 2022. Abdullahhad later withdrew from the bout, and was replaced by Dzianis Zuev who took the fight on short notice.

Korpivlenski faced Guerric Billet at Glory 81: Ben Saddik vs. Adegbuy 2 on August 20, 2022. He won the fight by unanimous decision.

Koprivlenski challenged Tyjani Beztati for the Glory Lightweight Championship at Glory: Collision 4 on October 8, 2022. He lost the fight by split decision.

Koprivlenski faced Kaito Ono at RISE WORLD SERIES / Glory Rivals 4 on December 25, 2022. He lost the fight by split decision. Two of the judges scored the bout 30–29 for Kaito, while the third judge scored it 30–29 for Koprivlenski.

Championships and accomplishments
Glory   
2017 Glory Lightweight (-70 kg/154.3 lb) Contender Tournament Winner
2017 Knockout Kick of the Year vs. Maykol Yurk
2018 Fight of the Year nomination
Max Fight
2022 Max Fight Lightweight Championship

Fight record

|-  style="background:#fbb;"
| 2022-12-25|| Loss ||align=left| Kaito Ono || RISE WORLD SERIES / Glory Rivals 4|| Tokyo, Japan || Decision (Split)|| 3 || 3:00|| 18–7

|-  style="background:#fbb;"
| 2022-10-08 || Loss||align=left| Tyjani Beztati || Glory: Collision 4 || Arnhem, Netherlands || Decision (Split) || 5 ||3:00 || 18–6
|-
! style=background:white colspan=9 |

|- style="background:#cfc;"
| 2022-08-20 || Win ||align=left| Guerric Billet || Glory 81: Ben Saddik vs. Adegbuyi 2 || Düsseldorf, Germany || Decision (Unanimous) || 3 ||3:00 || 18–5
|-
! style=background:white colspan=9 |

|- align="center" bgcolor= "#cfc"
| 2022-05-21 || Win ||align=left| Maxim Răilean || Max Fight 50 || Arbanasi, Bulgaria || TKO (High kick)  || 1 || N/A || 17–5
|- 
! style=background:white colspan=9 |
|-
|- align="center" bgcolor= "#cfc"
| 2022-02-12 || Win ||align=left| Dzianis Zuev || Fair Fight XVI || Yekaterinburg, Russia || Decision (Unanimous) || 3 || 3:00 || 16–5
|- 
|- align="center" bgcolor= "#cfc"
| 2021-12-11 || Win ||align=left| Arbi Emiev || Mix Fight Championship: Fight Club || Frankfurt, Germany || KO (Head kick) || 2 || 2:06 || 15–5
|-
|- align="center" bgcolor= "#cfc"
| 2021-10-23 || Win ||align=left| Bruno Gazani || Glory: Collision 3 || Arnhem, Netherlands || Decision (Unanimous) || 3 || 3:00 || 14–5
|-
|-  bgcolor="FFBBBB"   
| 2021-09-20 || Loss ||align=left| Sorin Căliniuc || Colosseum Tournament 27 || Oradea, Romania || Decision (split) || 5 || 3:00 || 13–5 
|-
! style=background:white colspan=9 |
|- 
|-  bgcolor="#cfc"
| 2021-08-02 || Win ||align=left| Artur Zakirko || Max Fight 46 || Sveti Vlas, Bulgaria || Decision (unanimous) || 3 || 3:00 || 13–4
|-
|-  bgcolor="#cfc"
| 2020-10-03 || Win ||align=left| Cristian Milea || The Spirit of Bulgaria || Plovdiv, Bulgaria || Decision (unanimous) || 3 || 3:00 || 12–4  
|- 
|-  bgcolor="FFBBBB"   
| 2019-12-07 || Loss ||align=left| Josh Jauncey || Glory 73: Shenzhen || Shenzhen, China || Decision (split) || 3 || 3:00 || 11–4  
|- 
|-  bgcolor="#cfc"
| 2019-06-22 || Win ||align=left| Mohammed Jaraya || Glory 66: Paris || Paris, France || TKO (doctor stoppage) || 3 || 2:13 || 11–3 
|- 
|-  bgcolor="FFBBBB"   
| 2018-12-08 || Loss ||align=left| Tyjani Beztati || Glory 62: Rotterdam || Rotterdam, Netherlands || Decision (unanimous) || 3 || 3:00 || 10–3 
|-
|-  bgcolor="#cfc"
| 2018-09-29 || Win ||align=left| Anil Cabri || Glory 59: Amsterdam || Amsterdam, Netherlands || Decision (unanimous) || 3 || 3:00 || 10–2  
|-
|-  bgcolor="FFBBBB"   
| 2018-03-31 || Loss ||align=left| Josh Jauncey || Glory 52: Los Angeles || Los Angeles, United States || Decision (split) || 3 || 3:00 || 9–2    
|-
|-  style="background:#cfc;"
| 2017-12-09 || Win ||align=left| Tyjani Beztati || Glory 49: Rotterdam - Lightweight Contender Tournament, Final || Rotterdam, Netherlands || Decision (unanimous) || 3 || 3:00 || 9–1   
|-
! style=background:white colspan=9 |
|-
|-  style="background:#cfc;"
| 2017-12-09 || Win ||align=left| Maykol Yurk || Glory 49: Rotterdam - Lightweight Contender Tournament, Semi Finals || Rotterdam, Netherlands || KO (head kick) || 1 || 2:47 || 8–1    
|-
|-  bgcolor="FFBBBB"  
| 2017-09-30 || Loss ||align=left| Kevin Hessling || Glory 45: Amsterdam || Amsterdam, Netherlands || Decision (unanimous) || 3 || 3:00 || 7–1   
|-
|-  style="background:#cfc;"
|2017-05-20 || Win ||align=left| Paul Jansen|| Glory 41: Holland || Den Bosch, Netherlands || Decision (unanimous) || 3 || 3:00 ||7–0
|-
|-  style="background:#cfc;"
| 2016-08-02 || Win ||align=left| Arbi Emiev || Max Fight 39 || Sveti Vlas, Bulgaria || Decision (unanimous) || 3 || 3:00 || 6–0
|-
|-  style="background:#cfc;"
| 2016-07-09 || Win ||align=left| Kurt Omer || || Zutphen, Netherlands || TKO (Three knockdowns) || 3 ||  || 5–0
|-
|-  style="background:#cfc;"
| 2015-12-27 || Win ||align=left| Radoslav Vartanyanov || Max Fight 37 || Burgas, Bulgaria || KO (liver punch) || 2 || 1:07 || 4–0
|-
|-  style="text-align:center; background:#CCFFCC;"
| 2015-02-28 || Win ||align=left| Jordi Fernandez || Ultimate Pro Fight 2 || Sofia, Bulgaria || Decision || 3 || 3:00 || 3–0

|-  style="text-align:center; background:#CCFFCC;"
| 2014-12-10 || Win ||align=left| Rangel Ivanov || Ultimate Pro Fight || Sofia, Bulgaria || TKO (Doctor Stoppage) || 2 || || 2–0

|-
| colspan=9 | Legend:

See also
List of male kickboxers

References

External links
 Stoyan Koprivlenski at Glory

1994 births
Living people
Sportspeople from Burgas
Bulgarian male kickboxers
Middleweight kickboxers
Bulgarian Muay Thai practitioners
Glory kickboxers
Bulgarian expatriate sportspeople in the Netherlands